Neelima Roy Sinha (born March 26, 1954) is an American botanist. She is a professor at the University of California Davis.

Early life and education 
Neelima Sinha was born on March 26, 1954, in a small town near New Delhi, India. She earned her masters in Botany from Lucknow University in 1975 after which she worked for nine years as a bank manager before returning to academia, first moving to Waco, Texas in 1985 for a one year masters in environmental studies and then in 1986 entered the University of California, Berkeley where she was the first student to join the lab Sarah Hake a maize geneticist at the Plant Gene Expression Center. At Berkeley Sinha studied the knotted1 gene in maize and tomato, earning her PhD in 1991. After graduation she received a postdoc fellowship from Pioneer Hi-Bred which supported her work on maize and tomato genetics working in a lab at Boston University which otherwise focused on Drosophila.

Career 
In 1995 Sinha was offered an accepted an assistant professor position in the Department of Plant Biology at University of California, Davis. She continued her career at UC-Davis, and is now a full professor in the Department of Plant Biology.

Research 
Sinha's research is in plant evolutionary developmental biology. Her early work examined the genes controlling leaf development, and she demonstrated that the KNOTTED-1 homeobox (knox1) gene regulates leaf formation in maize. Building on that work, she showed that knox genes are involved in determining leaf shape, and she uncovered additional genes involved in leaf development. She has also carried out research on the molecular genetics of plant parasites. In 2019, her work was profiled by the New Scientist.

Honors
She was elected to be a fellow in the American Association for the Advancement of Science in 2005 and the American Society of Plant Biologists in 2018

External links

References 

1954 births
Living people
American women botanists
American botanists
Botanical Society of America
University of California, Davis faculty
University of California, Berkeley alumni
20th-century American botanists
21st-century American botanists
20th-century American women scientists
21st-century American women scientists
Indian emigrants to the United States
People from New Delhi
University of Lucknow alumni